Bechraji is one of the 182 Legislative Assembly constituencies of Gujarat state in India. It is numbered as 23-Bechraji.

It is part of Mahesana district.

List of segments 

 Becharaji Taluka
 Mahesana Taluka (Part) Villages – Ajabpura, Aloda, Ambasan, Baliyasan, Balol, Bamosana, Bhasariya, Bhesana, Bodla, Boriavi, Buttapaldi, Chhathiyarda, Davada, Deloli, Devinapura, Dhanpura, Divanpura (Apapura), Gamanpura, Ghadha, Gilosan, Gokalpura, Gorad, Hardesan, Haripura, Harsundal, Heduva-Rajgar, Hinglajpura, Ijpura Barot, Ijpura Jethaji, Jagudan, Jakasna, Jotana, Kanpura, Karshanpura, Kasalpura, Katosan, Khadalpur, Khara, Kharsada, Laxmipura, Linch, Maguna, Manknaj, Mareda, Martoli, Memadpura, Mevad, Mitha, Modipur, Motidau, Mudarda, Nadasa (formerly part of Katosan State, yet paying a separately assigned tribute to Baroda), Nanidau, Nugar, Palaj, Palodar, Panchot, Piludara, Rampura (Katosan), Ramosana, Ranipura, Rupal, Sakhpurda, Sametra, Santhal, Sidosan, Sobhasan, Tejpura, Tundali, Vadosan, Virsoda, Virta.

Various of those villages have been the seat of or constituted on their own a minor or petty princely state, notably in Mahi Kantha Agency.

Members of Legislative Assembly

Election results

2022

2017

2012

See also
 List of constituencies of the Gujarat Legislative Assembly
 Mahesana district

References

External links
 

Assembly constituencies of Gujarat
Mehsana district